Deng Xiaoping's southern tour (simplified Chinese: 邓小平南巡; traditional Chinese: 鄧小平南巡), or 1992 southern tour (simplified Chinese: 九二南巡; traditional Chinese: 九二南巡), was the tour of Deng Xiaoping, late Paramount leader of China, in southern China, including in Shenzhen, Zhuhai, Guangzhou and  Shanghai, from January 18 to February 21, 1992. The talks and remarks made by Deng during the tour resumed and reinforced the implementation of his "Reforms and Opening-up" program in mainland China, which came to a halt after the military crackdown on 1989 Tiananmen Square protests ordered by Deng himself. The 1992 Southern Tour is widely regarded as a critical point in the modern history of China, as it saved the Chinese economic reform as well as the capital market, and preserved the stability of the society.

During the southern tour, Deng emphasized to several military leaders of the People's Liberation Army including Yang Shangkun, Liu Huaqing and Yang Baibing, that "those who do not promote reform should be brought down from their leadership positions", forcing Jiang Zemin, then General Secretary of the Chinese Communist Party (CCP), to support and continue the Reforms and Opening-up program. He also wished that Guangdong province would catch up with the "Four Asian Tigers" in terms of economic development within 20 years. Some of the notable remarks and comments from Deng during the tour included "I don't care if the cat is black or white, so long as it catches mice" （不管黑猫白猫，能捉到老鼠就是好猫）, which was originally published by him in 1960s, and "development is of overriding importance (发展才是硬道理)” as well as "[the Shenzhen government] should be bolder in carrying out the Reforms and Opening-up, dare to make experiments and should not act as women with bound feet".

However, although Deng himself mentioned that anti-corruption must be imposed throughout the entire Reforms and Opening-up process and emphasized the importance of rule of law, the Southern Tour did not resolve the corruption issue as well as the widening economic inequality in China, nor did it resume China's political reforms which failed and ended in the 1989 Tiananmen Square protests.

Historical background

Halt of Reforms and Opening-up 

Members of the Central Committee of the Chinese Communist Party (CCP) had serious disagreements on whether the Reforms and Opening-up program should continue after Deng Xiaoping ordered the military crackdown on 1989 Tiananmen Square protests. After Zhao Ziyang, former CCP General Secretary and a leading reformist, was forced to leave his position for supporting the students and opposing military suppression in the Tiananmen Square protests, Jiang Zemin was appointed the new General Secretary with the support of several powerful left-wing conservative leaders such as Chen Yun and Li Xiannian.

In November 1989, the Central Committee of CPC passed a resolution ("关于进一步治理整顿和深化改革的决定"), stating that the pace of reforms was too fast, and decided to overhaul the changes. As a result, the Reforms and Opening-up program came to a virtual halt, especially after the Revolutions of 1989 in Europe and around the time of the dissolution of the Soviet Union in 1991.

Media war 
Starting from the spring of 1991, the Liberation Daily newspaper in Shanghai published several articles authored by "Huang Fuping (皇甫平)", promoting reforms, which quickly gained support amongst local officials and populace. On the other hand, several media in Beijing, controlled by Jiang Zemin and Li Peng (then Premier of China), responded by directly criticizing the "Huang Fuping" articles and questioned whether China was following a capitalist path or a socialist path.

The tour 
At 87 years old, Deng Xiaoping began his southern tour on January 18, 1992, when he visited the Wuchang District of Wuhan in Hubei Province as well as Changsha in Hunan Province. He then visited several cities in Guangdong Province, including Shenzhen, Zhuhai and Guangzhou from January 19 to 29. After that, he briefly stayed in Jiangxi Province, and on January 31 Deng arrived in Shanghai, the last stop of his southern tour. After spending the 1992 Chinese New Year in Shanghai, Deng briefly visited Nanjing in Jiangsu Province as well as Anhui Province on his way back to Beijing on February 20.

At first, Deng's southern tour was ignored by Beijing and national media, which were then under the control of Deng's political rivals. Jiang Zemin, General Secretary of the Chinese Communist Party since 1989, showed little support. Nevertheless, media in Hong Kong first reported Deng's tour after receiving confirmation from Shenzhen government, while Shenzhen Special Zone Daily later gave a detailed report on Deng's southern tour in an article on March 26 without receiving approval from the China's central government, making it the first media to do so in the mainland China.

Shenzhen 

Around 9am on January 19, 1992, Deng Xiaoping arrived in Shenzhen, one of China's first special economic zones approved by himself, and was warmly received by local officials including Xie Fei, the Communist Party Secretary of Guangdong Province. Deng visited Guomao Building and some technology company the next day. On January 21, he visited the Overseas Chinese Town and the Splendid China Folk Village. In the morning of January 22, Deng visited the Fairy Lake Botanical Garden together with his wife, children and grandchildren, planting a tree there; in the afternoon, Deng delivered his famous lines to the officials of the Shenzhen government:"[The Shenzhen government] should be bolder in carrying out the Reforms and Opening-up, dare to make experiments and should not act as women with bound feet. If you think something is right, then bravely test it and embrace it. The important experience of Shenzhen is the daring spirit. Without this daring spirit and the courage, without the energy, you can not find a good path or a new path, and you can not create a new career. (改革开放胆子要大一些，敢于试验，不能像小脚女人一样。看准了的，就大胆地试，大胆地闯。深圳的重要经验就是敢闯。没有一点闯的精神，没有一点“冒”的精神，没有一股气呀、劲呀，就走不出一条好路，走不出一条新路，就干不出新的事业)During the visit, Deng wished that Guangdong Province would catch up with the "Four Asian Tigers" in terms of economic development within 20 years. Deng's visit also saved China's capital market, especially the two newly established stock exchanges: the Shanghai Stock Exchange (since November 1990) and the Shenzhen Stock Exchange (since December 1990). Deng pointed out that:It’ll take careful study to determine whether stocks and the stock market are good for socialism or not, or whether they only belong to capitalism. This also means that we must first try it out! (证券、股票，这些东西究竟好不好，有没有危险，是不是资本市场独有的东西，社会主义能不能用?允许看，但要坚决地试)

Zhuhai 
On January 23, Deng set off for Zhuhai, another special economic zone in Guangdong Province. In Zhuhai, Deng emphasized to several military leaders of the People's Liberation Army including Yang Shangkun, Liu Huaqing and Yang Baibing, that "those who do not promote reform should be brought down from their leadership positions". He also paid visits to several high-tech companies in Zhuhai, where he underlined the importance of science and technology and called on Chinese overseas students to come back to their motherland. Deng left the area on January 29.

Shanghai 

On January 31, Deng arrived in Shanghai, where he celebrated the 1992 Chinese New Year.

In Shanghai, Deng visited the Nanpu Bridge on February 7, and on the next day he toured the Huangpu River on a cruise ship, accompanied by local officials including Huang Ju and Wu Bangguo. Together with Yang Shangkun and others, Deng visited several high-tech companies in Shanghai beginning February 10. On February 18, he spent his night of the Lantern Festival in the shopping district of Nanjing Road.

Deng left Shanghai for Beijing on February 23, completing his southern tour. He was instrumental in the development of Shanghai's Pudong New Area, revitalizing the city as one of China's economic hubs.

Notable remarks 
On his tour, Deng made various speeches which generated large local support for his reformist platform. He stressed the importance of economic reform in China, and criticized those who were against further reform and opening up. Although there was a debate on whether or not Deng actually said it, his perceived catchphrase, "To get rich is glorious (致富光荣)" unleashed a wave of personal entrepreneurship that continues to drive China's economy today. He also stated that the "leftist" elements of the Communist Party were much more dangerous than "rightist" ones.

Some of the notable remarks from Deng Xiaoping during his southern tour included:

 "I don't care if the cat is black or white, so long as it catches mice (不管黑猫白猫，捉到老鼠就是好猫)", which was originally published by Deng in the 1960s but became widely known after the tour.
 "Development is of overriding importance (发展才是硬道理)”
 "[The Shenzhen government] should be bolder in carrying out the Reforms and Opening-up, dare to make experiments and should not act as women with bound feet (改革开放胆子要大一些，敢于试验，不能像小脚女人一样)"
 "Those who do not promote reform should be brought down from their leadership positions (谁不改革，谁就下台)"
"We should do more and engage less in empty talk (多干实事，少说空话)"
"Had it not been for the achievements of the reform and the open policy, we could have not weathered June 4th...Why was it that our country could remain stable after the June 4th Incident? It was precisely because we had carried out the reform and the open policy."

Effects 

Deng's new wave of policy rhetoric gave way to a new political storm between factions in the Politburo of the Chinese Communist Party. Jiang eventually sided with Deng in April 1992, and the national media finally reported Deng's southern tour almost two months after it completed. Observers suggest that Jiang's submission to Deng's policies had solidified his position as Deng's heir apparent. Behind the scenes, Deng's southern tour aided his reformist allies' such as Shanghai party committee secretary Zhu Rongji climb to the apex of national power, and permanently changed China's direction toward economic development. In addition, the eventual outcome of the southern tour proved that Deng was still the most powerful man in China.

Deng's southern tour saved China's capital market and protected the two stock exchanges in China: the Shanghai Stock Exchange (since November 1990) and the Shenzhen Stock Exchange (since December 1990). Moreover, his insistence on economic openness aided in the phenomenal growth levels of the coastal areas, especially the "Golden Triangle" region surrounding Shanghai. Deng reiterated the general policy that 'some areas must get rich before others', and asserted that the wealth from coastal regions will eventually be transferred to aid economic construction inland. The theory, however, faced numerous challenges when put into practice, as provincial governments moved to protect their own interests.

See also 
Shenzhen speed
Time is Money, Efficiency is Life
"Story of Spring"

References

Further reading 

 Ezra F. Vogel. Deng Xiaoping and the Transformation of China. . 2013.
Deng Xiaoping's Shenzhen Tour. People's Daily. 2010. (Archived in Wayback Machine on July 21, 2020)
 Carol Lee Hamrin, Suisheng Zhao and A. Doak Barnett. Decision-making in Deng's China: Perspectives from Insiders. . 1995.

Reform in China
1990s in China
Deng Xiaoping